La Muchacha del arrabal is a 1922 Argentine silent film directed and written by José A. Ferreyra with Leopoldo Torres Ríos.

Cast
Angel Boyano
Carlos Dux
Elena Guido
Carlos Lasalle
Lidia Liss

References

External links

1922 films
Argentine silent films
1920s Spanish-language films
Argentine black-and-white films
Films directed by José A. Ferreyra